The Unilateral Declaration of Independence of Rhodesia from the United Kingdom was signed by 12 ministers of the Rhodesian Cabinet, headed by Prime Minister Ian Smith, on 11 November 1965. Four junior members of the Cabinet—two ministers without portfolio, the chief whip and the deputy minister of information—did not sign, but were included in the official photograph.

Signatories
The 12 signatories were:

Four junior members of the Cabinet did not sign, but were included in the official photograph:

Notes and references
References

Bibliography

 
History of Rhodesia
Politics of Rhodesia
Rhodesian politicians
Ian Smith